Shapenkovo is a rural locality (a selo) in Barguzinsky District, Republic of Buryatia, Russia. The population was 199 as of 2010. There is 1 street.

Geography 
Shapenkovo is located 10 km south of Barguzin (the district's administrative centre) by road. Barguzin is the nearest rural locality.

References 

Rural localities in Barguzinsky District